Tomas Hökfelt (born 29 June 1940) is a Swedish physician and former professor in histology at the Karolinska Institutet from 1979 until 2006, when he got his emeritate. He was linked to the Department of Neuroscience and is specialized in cell biology.

Biography
Tomas Hökfelt was born in Stockholm, Sweden in 1940. He enrolled in the Karolinska Institutet in 1960 and got his BA in medicine in 1960. He then studied at the Karolinska Institutet under professor Nils-Åke Hillarp, studying monoamine neurons, getting his PhD in 1968 and his MD in 1971. He became an assistant professor in 1968, and from 1979 until 2006, Hökfelt worked as a professor at the Karolinska Institute. He was also a faculty member of the Department of Biotechnology at the Royal Institute of Technology in Stockholm.

Research and publications
Tomas Hökfelt's early research was on neurotransmitters and neuropeptides in the brain. In 1977 he discovered that non-neurotransmitter peptide molecules like somatostatin, can exist with neurotransmitters in same peripheral and central neurons.

Hökfelt together with Serguei Fetissov has also conducted research into anorexia nervosa, indicating that it may be a disease, caused by a particular group of antibodies.

Together with Anders Björklund, he has edited 21 volumes of the Handbook of Chemical Neuroanatomy between 1983 and 2005

Awards and honours
 1984 Member of the National Academy of Sciences
 1987: joint winner of the Artois-Baillet-Latour Health Prize for the study of neuropeptides
 1988: joint winner of the Bristol-Myers Squibb Award for Distinguished Achievement in Neuroscience Research
 1992: Doctor Honoris Causa at the University of Tampere, Finland
 1992: Doctor Honoris Causa at the University of Copenhagen, Denmark
 1999: Doctor Honoris Causa at the University of Ferrara, Italy
 1999: Doctor Honoris Causa at the Peking University Health Science Center, China
 2000: Foreign member of the Chinese Academy of Sciences
 2000: Doctor Honoris Causa at the Victor Segalen Bordeaux 2 University, France
 2007: winner of the Grande Médaille of the French Academy of Sciences for his study of neurotransmitters
 Honorary Member of the American Physiological Society
 Hökfelt was one of the fifty most often cited scientists in the period 1983-2003
 A more complete list of his awards and honours can be found at ISI.

Notes

Academic staff of the Karolinska Institute
Swedish neuroscientists
Living people
1940 births
Foreign associates of the National Academy of Sciences
Foreign members of the Chinese Academy of Sciences
Members of the National Academy of Medicine
Members of the Royal Swedish Academy of Sciences